Uribia is town and municipality of the La Guajira department of Colombia. It is the youngest municipality of this Department since the year 2000. Northern Zone of the Cerrejón coal mines are located in this municipality. The municipality also contains the Serranía de Macuira mountain range which is an isolated low altitude mountain range in the middle of La Guajira Desert. One third of this mountain range is also a National Natural Park of Colombia.

Geography and climate

The Municipality of Uribia covers most of the northern area of the Guajira Peninsula, the northernmost part of South America. Uribia borders to the north and west with the Caribbean Sea which surround more than half the municipality; to the east Uribia has a short border with the Bolivarian Republic of Venezuela; to the south its borders the municipality of Maicao and southwest the municipality of Riohacha.

The Upper Guajira is arid, presenting clay formations with scarce vegetation of cactus and other xerophiles. The Serranía de Macuira lies in the middle of the upper region presenting three predominant hills  or more above sea level in the Macuira, Jarará and La Teta.

Humidity is generally high enough to make the consistent heat very uncomfortable.

History

Evangelization

The process of evangelizations of the Wayuu people restarted in 1887 with the return of the Capuchin friars under reverend friar José María de Valdeviejas. In 1905, Pope Pius X created the Vicariate of La Guajira and as first Vicar, friar Atanasio Vicente Soler y Royo in an attempt to "civilize" the Wayuu people.

The friars the created the orphanages for Wayuu children beginning with the La Sierrita orphanage built in the Sierra Nevada de Santa Marta mountains in 1903; followed by the San Antonio orphanage in 1910 located by the Calancala River, Nazareth orphanage in the Serrania de Macuira mountains in 1913 creating a direct influence over the Rancherías of Guarrachal, El Pájaro, Carazúa, Guaraguao, Murumana, Garra patamana and Karraipía. While Nazareth had some control over the rancherías of Taroa, Maguaipa, Guaseipá and Alpanapause. The friars constantly visited the settlements inviting to attend mass. Wayuu children in the orphanage were educated with traditional European customs. Conflicts between the Wayuu people and the Colombian government decreased since then. In 1942 the village of Uribia celebrated for the first time Christmas and New Year's Eve.

Official foundation

Uribia was founded officially on March 1, 1935 by Captain Eduardo Londoño Villegas in honor of Colombian Liberal Party leader Rafael Uribe Uribe, prior to this the village was named Chitki in Wayuu language. The main plaza was created and named after Francisco de Paula Santander one of the leaders of the Colombian independence from Spain.

Capital of the Special Commissary of La Guajira

Uribia became a regional capital town of the Special Commissary of La Guajira until 1954, when the National Intendency of La Guajira was created and the capital transferred to Riohacha.

Culture

Uribia is predominantly inhabited by indigenous peoples pertaining to the Wayuu ethnic group. Cultural activities are directly related to them. The town celebrates the "Festival of the Wayuu Culture" from May 31 to June 1 every year.

Transportation

Puerto Bolívar Airport

Gallery

References

External links
 Gobernacion de La Guajira - Uribia
 Luis Angel Arango Library: Guajira visual memory

Municipalities of La Guajira Department